Rezaabad (also Romanized as Reẕāābād and Rezāābād; also known as Raziābād and Reẕāābā) is a village in Zalian Rural District, Zalian District, Shazand County, Markazi Province, Iran. At the 2006 census, its population was 90, in 24 families.

References 

Populated places in Shazand County